Recchia simplicifolia is a species of plant in the family Surianaceae.

It is a tropical tree endemic to Oaxaca and Veracruz  states in Mexico.

References

Surianaceae
Endemic flora of Mexico
Trees of Oaxaca
Trees of Veracruz
Endangered biota of Mexico
Endangered plants
Taxonomy articles created by Polbot